Andrew Jackson Sloan (May 9, 1835 – January 17, 1875) was an American soldier who fought for the Union Army during the American Civil War. He received the Medal of Honor for valor.

Biography
Sloan received the Medal of Honor in February 24, 1865 for his actions at the Battle of Nashville on December 16, 1864 while with Company H of the 12th Iowa Infantry Regiment.

Medal of Honor citation

Citation:

The President of the United States of America, in the name of Congress, takes pleasure in presenting the Medal of Honor to Private Andrew Jackson Sloan, United States Army, for extraordinary heroism on 16 December 1864, while serving with Company H, 12th Iowa Infantry, in action at Nashville, Tennessee. Private Sloan captured the flag of 1st Louisiana Battery (Confederate States of America)."

See also

List of American Civil War Medal of Honor recipients: Q-S

References

External links

1835 births
1875 deaths
Union Army soldiers
United States Army Medal of Honor recipients
American Civil War recipients of the Medal of Honor
People from Bedford County, Pennsylvania
Military personnel from Pennsylvania